Genetic may refer to:
Genetics, in biology, the science of genes, heredity, and the variation of organisms
Genetic, used as an adjective, refers to genes
Genetic disorder, any disorder caused by a genetic mutation, whether inherited or de novo
Genetic mutation, a change in a gene
Heredity, genes and their mutations being passed from parents to offspring
Genetic recombination, refers to the recombining of alleles resulting in a new molecule of DNA
Genetic relationship (linguistics), in linguistics, a relationship between two languages with a common ancestor language
Genetic algorithm, in computer science, a kind of search technique modeled on evolutionary biology

See also
Genetic memory (disambiguation)